Sven Erik Alf Sjöberg (21 June 1903 – 17 April 1980) was a Swedish theatre and film director. He won the Grand Prix du Festival at the Cannes Film Festival twice: in 1946 for Torment (part of an eleven-way tie), and in 1951 for his film Miss Julie (an adaptation of August Strindberg's play which tied with Vittorio De Sica's Miracle in Milan).

Despite his success with those films, Sjöberg was foremost a stage director, perhaps the greatest at Dramaten (alongside first Olof Molander and later Ingmar Bergman). He was a First Director of Sweden's Royal Dramatic Theatre between 1930 and 1980; he staged there many remarkable and historic productions. Sjöberg was also a pioneer director of drama for early Swedish TV (his 1955 TV production of Hamlet is a national milestone). At the 3rd Guldbagge Awards Sjöberg won the award for Best Director for the film Ön.

Sjöberg died in a car accident on his way to rehearsal at the Royal Dramatic Theatre in Stockholm.

Filmography

Actor
Ingmar's Inheritance (1925)
The Poetry of Ådalen (1928)
Resan Bort (1945)

Director
 The Strongest (1929)
They Staked Their Lives (Med livet som insats) (1940)
 Blossom Time (1940)
Home from Babylon (1941)
The Heavenly Play (Himlaspelet) (1942)
Kungajakt (1944)
Torment (Hets) (1944) From a synopsis by Ingmar Bergman, who served as assistant director. Nominated for the Golden Lion at the Venice Film Festival in 1947. Shared the Grand Prix du Festival International du Film at the 1946 Cannes Film Festival
 The Journey Away (1945)
Iris and the Lieutenant (Iris och löjtnantshjärta) (1946) 
Only a Mother (Bara en mor) (1949)
Miss Julie (Fröken Julie) (1951) Shared the Grand Prix du Festival International du Film at the 1951 Cannes Film Festival
Barabbas (1953)
Karin Månsdotter (1954)
Wild Birds (Vildfåglar) (1955)
Last Pair Out (Sista paret ut) (1956)
The Judge (Domaren) (1960)
Ön (1966)
)

Writer
They Staked Their Lives (Med livet som insats) (1940)
Den blomstertid (1940)
Hem från Babylon (1941)
Only a Mother (Bara en mor) (1949)
The Heavenly Play (Himlaspelet) (1942)
Resan bort (1945)
Miss Julie (Fröken Julie) (1951)
Karin Månsdotter (1954)
Wild Birds (Vildfåglar) (1955)
The Judge (Domaren) (1960)
Ön (1966)

References

External links

1903 births
1980 deaths
Artists from Stockholm
Road incident deaths in Sweden
Swedish theatre directors
Swedish film directors
Best Director Guldbagge Award winners
Directors of Palme d'Or winners
Burials at Galärvarvskyrkogården